Eomesodermin also known as T-box brain protein 2 (Tbr2) is a protein that in humans is encoded by the EOMES gene.

The Eomesodermin/Tbr2 gene, EOMES, encodes a member of a conserved protein family that shares a common DNA-binding domain, the T-box. T-box genes encode  transcription factors, which control gene expression, involved in the regulation of developmental processes. Eomesodermin/Tbr2 itself controls regulation of radial glia, as well as other related cells. Eomesodermin/Tbr2 has also been found to have a role in immune response, and there exists some loose evidence for its connections in other systems.

Nervous system development

Neurogenesis 
Eomesodermin/Tbr2 is expressed highly in the intermediate progenitor stage of the developing neuron. Neurons, the primary functional cells of the brain, are developed from radial glia cells. This process of cells developing into other types of cells is called differentiation. Radial glia are present in the ventricular zone of the brain, which are on the lateral walls of the lateral ventricles. Radial glia divide and migrate towards the surface of the brain, the cerebral cortex. During this migration, there are three stages of cellular development: radial glia, intermediate progenitors, and postmitotic projection neurons. Radial glia express Pax6, while intermediate progenitor cells express Eomesodermin/Tbr2, and postmitotic projection neurons express Tbr1. This process, known as neurogenesis, occurs mainly in the developing cortex before the organism has fully developed, and thus Eomesodermin/Tbr2 has been implicated in neurodevelopment.

Tbr2 has been observed in a transcription factor cascade to enable to development of glutamatergic neurons. Pax6, as expressed by radial glia cells, activates the transcription of Neurogenin-2 which then activates the generation of intermediate progenitor cells (IPC) expressing Tbr2. These cells are localized within the subventricular zone. The IPCs then undergo symmetric division to produce NeuroD expressing cells that can differentiate in TBR1 neurons. Similar mechanisms have been observed in both embryonic and adult neurogenesis.  

Tbr2 inactivation has also been tied to deficiencies in cortical neurogenesis further suggesting the importance of the cascade in activating and maintaining neuron production. It has been found experimentally through knockout studies that mice lacking Eomesodermin/Tbr2 during early development have a reduced number of actively dividing cells, called proliferating cells, in the subventricular zone. This, may lead to the microcephaly (small head size due to improper brain development) seen in Eomesodermin/Tbr2 deficient mice. Eomesodermin/Tbr2 lacking mice have smaller upper cortical layers and a smaller sub ventricular zone in the brain, and have an absence of a mitral cell (neurons involved in the olfactory pathway) layer, with mitral cells instead being scattered about. Phenotypically, Eomesodermin/Tbr2 lacking mice show high anger levels and perform infanticide. Eomesodermin/Tbr2 lacking mice also seem to have problems with long axon connections. Axons are projections from neurons that connect with other cells in what is called a synapse and send neurotransmitters. In this way, they can communicate with other cells, and form the processing that allows are brains to function. Eomesodermin/Tbr2 lacking mice seem to lack fully formed commissural fibers, which connect the two hemispheres of the brain, and lack the corpus callosum, another region of the brain involved in hemisphere connections.

Role in adult development 
There are locations within the brain that have been discovered to perform neurogenesis into adulthood,  including the ventricular zone. The hippocampus, which is involved in memory formation, shows decreased neurogenesis when Eomesodermin/Tbr2 is removed. It was also found that Eomesodermin/Tbr2 functions by reducing amounts of Sox2, which is associated with radial glia. Another study found that mice without Eomesodermin/Tbr2 lacked long term memory formation, which may relate to Eomesodermin/Tbr2's effects on the hippocampus.

Cardiac development 
Early in development, Eomesodermin/Tbr2 controls early differentiation of the cardiac mesoderm. Lack of Eomesodermin/Tbr2 appears to be correlated with failure to differentiate into cardiomyocytes. Eomesodermin/Tbr2 controls the expression of cardiac specific genes Mesp1, Myl7, Myl2, Myocardin, Nkx2.5 and Mef2c.

Immune response 

Eomesodermin/Tbr2 is highly expressed in CD8+ T cells, but not CD4+ T cells. CD4+ T cells are the helper T cells which detect foreign particles in the body, and call CD8+ T cells to facilitate death of the foreign particles. Eomesodermin/Tbr2 was found to play a role in the anti cancer properties of CD8+ T cells. Lack of Eomesodermin/Tbr2, alongside T bet, another T box protein, caused CD8+ T cells to not penetrate tumors so they could perform their anti cancer duties. Eomesodermin/Tbr2 prevents CD8+ cells from differentiating into other types of T cells, but does not play a role in the production of CD8+ T cells itself.

See also 
 T-box family
 TBR1

References

Further reading 
 
 
 
 
 
 
 
 
 
 
 

Transcription factors